Copia may refer to:

 Copia Vineyards and Winery, a premium winery in Paso Robles, California
 Copia (or Copiae), the ancient city and bishopric also called Thurii or Thurium, now a Latin Catholic titular
COPIA, a metal band from Melbourne, Australia
 Copia (Boeotia) (or Copae or Copiae), an ancient Greek city in Boeotia
 Copia: Foundations of the Abundant Style, a 1512 rhetorical guidebook by Desiderius Erasmus
 Copia: The American Center for Wine, Food & the Arts, the former museum in Napa, California
 The Culinary Institute of America at Copia, a branch campus of the culinary school
 Cornucopia, a symbol of abundance and nourishment
 Copia (album), a 2007 album by Eluvium
 A LTR-Retrotransposon, genetic element found in many animals and plants
 Cardinal Copia, the "fourth" lead singer of Swedish metal band, Ghost
 Jacques-Louis Copia (1764–1799), French engraver
 Isis Copia, pen name of May Ziadeh